Rev. George William Hall D.D. (1770–1843) was Master of Pembroke College, Oxford (1809–1843) and Vice-Chancellor of Oxford University (1820–1824).

Education
He was born on 12 March 1770 and baptised one month later. George was educated at John Roysse's Free School in Abingdon-on-Thames (now Abingdon School). He was a Fellow at Lincoln College and Pembroke College in Oxford. BA 1792, MA 1795, BD and Doctor of Divinity 1809.

Career

He became Master of Pembroke College, Oxford in 1809 and remained until his death in the third quarter of 1843. He was responsible for overseeing the remodelling of several of the college's features including Broadgates Hall, the Old Quad and the frontage of St. Aldates. He was also Vice Chancellor at Pembroke, from 1820 to 1824.

He was rector of Taynton, Gloucestershire and canon of Gloucester from 1810 until his death in 1843.

See also
 List of Old Abingdonians
 List of Pembroke College, Oxford, people

References

External links
 A notice issued by George William Hall, 23 April 1821.

1770 births
1843 deaths
People educated at Abingdon School
Fellows of Lincoln College, Oxford
Fellows of Pembroke College, Oxford
Masters of Pembroke College, Oxford
Vice-Chancellors of the University of Oxford